Holland-on-Sea is a seaside town in east Essex in England. Located south of the little village of Great Holland and directly north of Clacton-on-Sea, it has bus links to Walton-on-the-Naze and Clacton-on-Sea. It is a short coastal walk down the coastline to Clacton.

There is a public library, four churches, St Bartholomew’s Church (Church of England), All Souls Catholic Church, Holland Methodist and a Baptist church. The village has several independent shops, a village hall, a primary school, one main hotel (The Kings Cliff Hotel), plus a number of guest houses and pubs. It has several beaches with facilities for bathing and boating. There are two Sites of Special Scientific Interest, Holland Haven Marshes, part of which is Holland Haven Country Park, and Holland-on-Sea Cliff.

History 
Holland-on-Sea was known as Little Holland, a small village until the early 20th century.

During the Second World War Holland-on-Sea was fortified against German attack. There is a Martello tower in nearby Clacton, which was also used during the Second World War. There is a Second World War pill box in Holland Haven Country Park. After the Second World War Holland-on-Sea went back to being a holiday town.

Government
There are several elected representatives at different levels of government which act for Holland-on-Sea, Essex.

District Councillors
There are two St Bartholomews District Councillors which represent the area at Tendring District Council. The District Council is responsible for local services, planning, council housing and refuse collection. Most district councillors are not paid a salary, but receive a basic allowance for the work they do. The current district councillors are Colin Cowlin (Holland-on-Sea Residents' Association) and Kanagasund-Ram King (Holland-on-Sea Residents' Association).

County Councillor
The County Councillor for Clacton East represents the area on Essex County Council. The County Council is responsible for local services, including education, social services, transport, roads (except trunk roads and motorways), public rights of way and libraries. Most County Councillors are not paid a salary, but receive a basic allowance for the work they do.

Member of Parliament
The town is part of the Clacton parliamentary constituency. The current MP is Giles Watling (Conservative).

Sport
Holland-on-Sea is the home of the Gunfleet Sailing Club, based near the junction of Marine Parade and Hazelmere Road. The Gunfleet Sailing Club was named after the Gunfleet Sands, a sand bank situated approximately 7 miles from the coast of Walton on the Naze stretching towards Clacton, the site of the abandoned Gunfleet Lighthouse and Gunfleet Sands Offshore Wind Farm.

Also located along Holland Haven is The Gunfleet Boating Club. This club caters for small Boat Fisherman, Skiers, Jet Ski users and Kayak/Canoe users. The club boasts full launch facilities, Showers, Bar and social area. The club has been established for over 30 years as a members only club run by an elected committee.  Members who benefit from the club not only come from the immediate area but far afield as London and throughout East Anglia. Holland Haven has excellent beaches which were upgraded between 2014 and 2015.

Holland-on-Sea has a football club called Holland F.C. and also is home to Clacton Cricket Club.

Climate
In East Anglia, the warmest time of the year is July and August, when maximum temperatures average around 21 °C (70 °F). The coolest time of the year is January and February, when minimum temperatures average around 1 °C (34 °F)

East Anglia's average annual rainfall is about 605 millimetres, with October to January being the wettest months.

Notable residents
The singer Sade lived in the town with her family between the ages of 11 and 18.

References

Populated coastal places in Essex
Clacton-on-Sea